Empress Li or Empress Dowager Li may refer to:

Empress Li (Li Shi's wife) (fl. 343), empress of the Cheng Han state 
Empress Li (Former Qin) (fl. 392–393), empress of Former Qin 
Li Lingrong (died 400), empress dowager of the Jin Dynasty
Empress Li (Huiyi) (died 409?), empress of Northern Yan
Li Zu'e (died after 581), empress of Northern Qi
Li Ezi (536–588), empress dowager of Northern Zhou
Empress Li (Liu Shouguang's wife) (died 914), empress of Yan
Li Chunyan (died 939), empress of the Min state, married to Wang Jipeng
Empress Li (Wang Yanxi) (died 944), empress of the Min state, married to Wang Yanxi
Empress Li (Later Jin) (died 950), empress of Later Jin
Empress Li (Later Han) (died 954), empress of Later Han
Empress Dowager Li (Later Shu) (died 965), empress dowager of Later Shu
Empress Mingde (Song dynasty) (960–1004), empress of the Song Dynasty, married to Emperor Taizong
Li Fengniang (1144–1200), empress of the Song Dynasty, married to Emperor Guangzong

See also
Consort Li (disambiguation)

Li